27th U-boat Flotilla ("27. Unterseebootsflottille") was a training flotilla ("Ausbildungsflottille") of Nazi Germany's Kriegsmarine during World War II.

The flotilla was founded at Gotenhafen in January 1940 under the command of Korvettenkapitän Ernst Sobe as Taktische Unterseebootsausbildungsflottille ("Tactical U-boat Training Flotilla"), and was redesignated 27. Unterseebootsflottille in June 1940.

This was where new U-boat crews received their tactical training (Taktische Ausbildung Unterseeboote), also taking part in an eight- to fifteen-day tactical exercise (Taktische Übung), a simulated convoy battle in the Baltic Sea. A U-boat might have to take part in more than one exercise, for example  needed two attempts in the spring of 1941, before being declared combat ready. The flotilla was the last training station for new U-boats. It disbanded in March 1945.

Flotilla commanders 
 Korvettenkapitän Ernst Sobe (January 1940–December 1941) 
 Fregattenkapitan Werner Hartmann (December 1941–October 1942) 
 Korvettenkapitän Erich Topp (October 1942–August 1944) 
 Kapitänleutnant Ernst Bauer (October 1944–March 1945)

Assigned U-boats
One U-boat was assigned to this flotilla during its service.

References 

27
Military units and formations established in 1940
Military units and formations disestablished in 1945